This is a list of television programs formerly and currently broadcast by the Canadian television channel E!. Some of these programs are shown at the same time in Canada and the United States. This list is current as of April 2021.

Current programming

Original programming
Brave New Girls
Celebrity Style Story
Pop Quiz

Acquired from E!

The Comment Section
"10 Things You Don't Know"
"Celebrity Call Center"
E! News
Daily Pop
"Botched"
Fashion Police
Flip it like Disick
Keeping Up with the Kardashians
Revenge Body with Khloe Kardashian
Very Cavallari
Live From the Red Carpet
New Money
The Royals
Secret Societies of Hollywood
The Soup
Stewarts & Hamiltons
Total Divas
Overserved with Lisa Vanderpump
"E! True Hollywood Story"
"Dr. 90210"
"Total Bellas"

Other acquired series

Criminal Minds
Botched
Cash Cab
MasterChef Canada
Corner GasElementary
  Escape to the Country
  Holmes on Homes
  The Good Doctor
  Friends
FlashpointRidiculousnessFormer programming
This a list of programs that have previously been broadcast under both the Star! and E! identities.

A-E

 Access Hollywood Action! American Idol Extra America's Next Top Model The Anna Nicole Show Arts & Minds Australia's Next Top Model Awesome 80s Back In... Back In...Love Battle of the Stars Because I Said SoBeing Human Best! Movies! Ever! Big Hollywood Countdown Books Into FilmBridalplasty Britain's Next Top Model Canada's Next Top Model Celebrity Poker ShowdownChelsea Lately Child Star Confidential City Lights Daily 10 Design DirectorsDish Nation The Ellen DeGeneres Show EverythingF-JFashion Television The Fashionista Diaries Girls Next DoorGoggleboxHolly's World Hollywood & Vines Hollywood Hold'em I Heart I Pity the FoolIce Loves Coco In Fashion It's Good to Be... Jimmy Kimmel Live!Just Shoot MeK-OKatie and PeterKendraKhloe and Lamar Late Night with Jimmy Fallon Linehan ListedLook-A-Like Make Me A Star Making ItMarried to RockMovie Night Movie Television My Name Is Earl On Screen One Shot Oprah's Big GiveP-T

 Party @ The Palms Popaganda The Producers Revealed with Jules AsnerRich Kids of Beverly HillsSaved By The Bell Sex MattersSo You Think You Can Dance Canada South Sydney Story Star! at the Movies Star! Attraction Star! Close Up Star Culture Star! Daily Star Dates Star! Inside Star! on the Red Carpet Star Portraits Star! Specials Star Treatment Starstruck Startv Starville Style Her Famous Talk Soup Taradise This Is This Is David Gest The Tonight Show with Jay Leno 
 tvFrames The ViewU-Z

 Welcome to the Parker Who Wore It Better? Wild On!''

References

External links
 E!
 CTV Media (E! Canada)

E!